Jane Kirby was a Canadian figure skater who was the ladies gold medallist in the 1951 Canadian Figure Skating Championships. She and her partner Donald Tobin were bronze medallists in the pairs competition in the 1951 Canadian Figure Skating Championships and North American Figure Skating Championships. She later turned professional and skated with the Ice Capades.

Results
ladies singles

pairs with Tobin

References

Canadian female single skaters
Canadian female pair skaters
Year of birth missing (living people)
Place of birth missing (living people)
Living people